The Qalipu First Nation (Pronounced: ha-lee-boo, meaning: Caribou), is a Mi’kmaq band government, created by order-in-council in 2011 pursuant to the Agreement for the Recognition of the Qalipu Mi’kmaq Band. After the band was approved as a First Nation, 100,000 people applied for membership and a total of 23,000 were approved.

This band is a landless band based on the island of Newfoundland. The Qalipu First Nation is accepted by the Mi'kmaq Grand Council. In 2018, Qalipu First Nation also was accepted as a member of the Assembly of First Nations.

History prior to recognition

Pre-contact
At the time of European contact, the Mi'kmaq people inhabited Miꞌkmaꞌki, which covered modern-day Nova Scotia, Prince Edward Island, northeastern New Brunswick, and the Gaspé Peninsula.

By the 17th century, the Mi'kmaq would often visit the island they called Taqamkuk (present-day Newfoundland) by crossing the Cabot Strait in shallops that they adopted from European traders. They visited the island and hunted along the south coast as far east as Placentia Bay before returning to Unamaki. They gradually made Taqamkuk among their "domain of islands". Some  Mi'kmaq have argued that in addition, a group of Mi'kmaq lived on the island for hundreds of years. The island's Indigenous population, the Beothuk, are said to have gone extinct in the early 1800s.

Permanent settlement in Newfoundland
During the colonial period, when the French and British competed for claims to land in North America, the Mi'kmaq became allied with France with whom they traded. Together they raided settlements of the English in New England and in the Maritime provinces of the future Canada. In 1763, after France was defeated by Britain in the Seven Years' War, it ceded all its land east of the Mississippi River to Great Britain, including the Mi'kmaq's traditional land. After this, numerous British colonists entered that territory and tried to settle.

Newfoundland, however, was still sparsely populated, and most Europeans lived on the eastern portion of the island and only in small isolated coastal settlements. The Mi'kmaq living on the island were essentially able to continue their traditional way of life on the island's west coast and in the interior. After the Beothuk people declined in the 1800s, the Mi'kmaq no longer shared Newfoundland's interior with anyone. In 1857, a colonial census of Newfoundland recorded Mi'kmaq settlements at St. George's Bay, Codroy Valley, Bay d'Espoir, and the Bay of Exploits.

The English and other Europeans had little knowledge of the interior and relied on the Mi'kmaq as guides. In 1822, explorer William Cormack traversed Newfoundland's interior from Trinity Bay to St. George's Bay. He was guided by a Mi'kmaw man named Sylvester Joe. In the 1860s, the British hired some Mi'kmaq men to deliver the mail overland through a network of trails reaching the northern communities.

Late 19th century decline
In 1898, a railway was constructed across the island, giving Europeans greater access to Newfoundland's interior. Numerous Europeans came to hunt the caribou herds, causing a sharp decline in the species population. The caribou had served as one of the main sources of food for the Mi'kmaq and their decline adversely affected the survival of the Mi'kmaq. Starting in the 1920s, global fur prices began to decline as well, and some Mi'kmaq left trapping to work for Europeans as loggers.

Drive for recognition
In 1972 activists formed the Native Association of Newfoundland and Labrador as the main organization representing the Mi'kmaq, Innu and Inuit peoples of Newfoundland and Labrador. After the Labrador Innu and Inuit left the Association in 1975, the organization was renamed as the Federation of Newfoundland Indians. The FNI included six Mi'kmaq bands (Elmastogoeg First Nations, Corner Brook Indian Band, Flat Bay Indian Band, Gander Bay Indian Band, Glenwood Mi'kmaq First Nation and the Port au Port Indian Band). The provincial government supported the FNI.
The federal government approved only the petition for recognition made by the Mi'kmaq at Conne River. In 1987, the Miawpukek Mi'kmaq First Nation was recognized under the Indian Act, and their community of Conne River was classified as reserved land for the Mi'kmaq.

Recognition for the remainder of Newfoundland's Mi'kmaq was a much longer process. The group's attempts to obtain status under the Indian Act were fruitless, and led to a Federal Court action in 1989, in which the FNI sought a declaration that its members were Indians within the meaning of the 1867 Constitution Act. Minister David Crombie was willing to work with the FNI and the government of Newfoundland, but the provincial government considered it to be a federal matter.

In 2003, Minister Andy Scott was presented with a report that recommended a First Nations band without any reserved land to represent the Mi'kmaq of Newfoundland. An Agreement-in-principle was reached in 2006, which the FNI accepted in 2007. The federal government ratified it in 2008.

Membership

The Government of Canada had expected band membership to be similar to the membership of the Federation of Newfoundland Indians, around 5,000 people. Instead, around 100,000 people, or the equivalent of one-fifth of the population of Newfoundland, applied to become band members.

After the first round of enrollment, 23,000 of 30,000 applicants were accepted. Although not yet functional, the band became the second largest by membership in Canada. This put the enrolment process to a halt and a supplemental agreement between the Federation of Newfoundland Indians and Canada was formed in 2013. The rest of the outstanding applications were put in indefinite storage. In 2013 applicants organized a new group, the Mi’kmaq First Nations Assembly of Newfoundland to lobby to continue the enrollment process. They began to prepare for a legal action regarding the enrollment process should lobbying fail. In 2014, parliament passed Bill C-25, authorizing it to review all applications and retroactively reject some, based on criteria similar to those used in the R v Powley case that defined rights for the Métis people. The 2013 agreement tightened rules and criteria thus leaving 80,000+ applicants rejected in its wake. In 2017, only 18,044 were eligible for membership. In 2018, the Qalipu First Nation announced that the updated Founding Members List for the Band was adopted by way of an Order in Council which came into effect on June 25, 2018. The 2018 Band list included 18,575 members. By 2021, nearly 24,000 people were recognized as founding members, in 67 Newfoundland communities and abroad.

Questions of legitimacy

In 2013, Chiefs Terrance Paul and Gerard Julian, co-chairs of the Assembly of Nova Scotia Chiefs, sent a joint letter to the Minister of Aboriginal Affairs and Northern Development Canada. They presented their concerns regarding the legitimacy of the Qalipu band, and asked for further clarification and explanation by the federal government. They disputed the authority of the federal government to determine who qualifies as Mi’kmaq. They said that, while the government of Canada may have jurisdiction over who is an Indian, they do not have the constitutional right to determine who is a Mi’kmaw.

Later in 2013, the Mi’kmaq Grand Council, the traditional government of the Mi'kmaq people, issued a statement to the United Nations denouncing the Qalipu band as illegitimate. The letter stated, "These new Qalipu members we simply do not know and do not recognize as Mi’kmaq." Since then, representatives of the Mi'kmaq Grand Council have visited Newfoundland to meet with the Qalipu Chief and Council, and community members acknowledging the extended Mi'kmaq family in Newfoundland. During the visit Grand Keptin Antle Denny, spokesperson for the Grand Council, said, "We were happy to visit and meet some of our relations, visit communities and acknowledge our extended Mi’kmaq family. Unity is the Mi’kmaq way.”

The Mi'kmaq Rights Initiative assert that the Qalipu were created as an entity by the federal government, and they do not consider them as part of the broader Mi'kmaq nation.

The Friends of Qalipu Advocacy Association is currently taking Qalipu First Nation (and its precursor) to court over the enrolment process.

Governance
A band council is elected under the Qalipu Mi’kmaq First Nation Band Custom Election Rules, which were a part of the agreement with the Canadian government.  Changes to the Custom Election Rules can be made only after a referendum voted on by the whole band membership. In 2021, a referendum passed changing terms of office to four years starting in 2024.

Council
Members of the Qalipu Mi'kmaq First Nation elect a Chief (currently Brendan Mitchell), 2 Vice Chiefs, and councillors representing a total of 9 wards.

Wards and Councillors
Shown below are the electoral districts and the results from the 2021 election.

References

First Nations in Newfoundland and Labrador
First Nations governments in Atlantic Canada
Mi'kmaq in Canada
Mi'kmaq governments
2011 establishments in Newfoundland and Labrador
Indigenous peoples in Newfoundland and Labrador